70 (seventy) is the natural number following 69 and preceding 71.

In mathematics
70 is:

 a sphenic number because it factors as 3 distinct primes.
 a Pell number.
 the seventh pentagonal number.
 the fourth tridecagonal number.
 the fifth pentatope number.
 the number of ways to choose 4 objects out of 8 if order does not matter. This makes it a central binomial coefficient.
 the smallest weird number, a natural number that is abundant but not semiperfect.
 a palindromic number in bases 9 (779), 13 (5513) and 34 (2234).
 a Harshad number in bases 6, 8, 9, 10, 11, 13, 14, 15 and 16.
 an Erdős–Woods number, since it is possible to find sequences of 70 consecutive integers such that each inner member shares a factor with either the first or the last member.

The sum of the first 24 squares starting from 1 is 70 = 4900, i.e. a square pyramidal number. This is the only non trivial solution to the cannonball problem and relates 70 to the Leech lattice and thus string theory.

In science
70 is the atomic number of ytterbium, a lanthanide

Astronomy
Messier object M70, a magnitude 9.0 globular cluster in the constellation Sagittarius
The New General Catalogue object NGC 70, a magnitude 13.4 spiral galaxy in the constellation Andromeda

In religion
 In Jewish tradition:
 Seventy souls went down to Egypt to begin the Hebrews' Egyptian exile.
 There is a core of 70 nations and 70 world languages, paralleling the 70 names in the Table of Nations.
 There were 70 men in the Great Sanhedrin, the Supreme Court of ancient Israel. (Sanhedrin 1:4.)
 According to the Jewish Aggada, there are 70 perspectives ("faces") to the Torah (Numbers Rabbah 13:15).
 Seventy elders were assembled by Moses on God's command in the desert.
  allots three score and ten (70 years) for a man's life, and the Mishnah attributes that age to "strength" (Avot 5:32), as one who survives that age is described by the verse as "the strong".
Ptolemy II Philadelphus ordered 72 Jewish elders to translate the Torah into Greek; the result was the Septuagint (from the Latin for "seventy"). The Roman numeral seventy, LXX, is the scholarly symbol for the Septuagint.
 In Christianity:
In , Jesus tells Peter to forgive people seventy times seven times.
In , Jesus appoints Seventy Disciples and sends them out in pairs to preach the Gospel.
Seventy is a priesthood office in the Latter Day Saint religion.
 In Islamic history and in Islamic interpretation the number 70 or 72 is most often and generally hyperbole for an infinite amount:
 There are 70 dead among the Prophet Muhammad's adversaries during the Battle of Badr.
 70 of the Prophet Muhammad's followers are martyred at the Battle of Uhud.
 In Shia Islam, there are 70 martyrs among Imam Hussein's followers during the Battle of Karbala.

In law
In certain cases, copyrights expire after 70 years.

In sports
In Olympic archery, the targets are 70 meters from the archers.
In college football, two teams scored 70 points in bowl games, the most in such contests: first the West Virginia Mountaineers against the Clemson Tigers in the 2012 Orange Bowl, and the Army Black Knights against the Houston Cougars in the 2018 Armed Forces Bowl.
 The number of the laps of the Canadian Grand Prix and Hungarian Grand Prix.

In other fields

 70 miles per hour is a common speed limit for freeways in many American states, primarily in the central United States (in the Eastern U.S. the speed limit is generally 65, in the Western U.S. it is 75).
 70 miles per hour is the national speed limit in the United Kingdom for cars and motorcycles on the best grades of road.
 70 years of marriage is marked by a platinum wedding anniversary.
 70 is the hull number of the U.S. Navy's nuclear aircraft carrier USS Carl Vinson (CVN-70), named after U.S. Representative Carl Vinson.
 The French department Haute-Saône is number 70.
 As a year, "70" may refer to 70 BC, AD 70, or 1970.
 The number 70 is frequently referenced by the musical duo Boards of Canada: they have songs titled "Sixtyten" (Music Has the Right to Children, 1998) and "The Smallest Weird Number" (Geogaddi, 2002), and their record label is named Music70.
Under Social Security (United States), the age at which a person can receive the maximum retirement benefits (and may do so and continue working without reduction of benefits)

Number name

(For French, this is true only in France; other French-speaking regions such as Belgium, Switzerland, Aosta Valley and Jersey use .)

Notes

External links

On some Philological Peculiarities in the English Authorized Version of the Bible. By Thomas Watts, Esq.

Integers

la:Septuaginta